Laura Siegemund was the defending champion, but could not defend her title due to a right knee injury.

Kateřina Siniaková won the title, defeating Caroline Wozniacki in the final, 6–3, 6–4.

Seeds

Draw

Finals

Top half

Bottom half

Qualifying

Seeds

Qualifiers

Lucky loser

Draw

First qualifier

Second qualifier

Third qualifier

Fourth qualifier

Fifth qualifier

Sixth qualifier

External Links
 Main draw
 Qualifying draw

Swedish Open - Singles
2017 Women's Singles
2017 in Swedish women's sport